The 1957 edition of the Campeonato Carioca kicked off on July 21, 1957 and ended on December 22, 1957. It was organized by FMF (Federação Metropolitana de Futebol, or Metropolitan Football Federation). Twelve teams participated. Botafogo won the title for the 10th time. no teams were relegated.

System
The tournament would be disputed in a double round-robin format, with the team with the most points winning the title.

Championship

References

Campeonato Carioca seasons
Carioca